Canariella pthonera is a species of small air-breathing land snails, terrestrial pulmonate gastropod mollusks in the family Canariellidae, the hairy snails and their allies.  This species is endemic to Spain.

References

Endemic fauna of the Canary Islands
Molluscs of the Canary Islands
Canariella
Endemic fauna of Spain
Gastropods described in 1883
Taxonomy articles created by Polbot